Countess of Shaftesbury is a title given to the wife of the Earl of Shaftesbury. Women who have held the title include:

Dorothy Ashley-Cooper, Countess of Shaftesbury (c.1656–1698)
Emily Ashley-Cooper, Countess of Shaftesbury (1810–1872), wife of Anthony Ashley-Cooper, 7th Earl of Shaftesbury
Constance Ashley-Cooper, Countess of Shaftesbury (1875–1957), wife of Anthony Ashley-Cooper, 9th Earl of Shaftesbury
Jamila M'Barek (born c.1961), widow of Anthony Ashley-Cooper, 10th Earl of Shaftesbury